Sixteen South is a company creating, producing and distributing television for children.

Founded in Belfast in 2007 by Colin Williams, they currently employ over 100 people and have partnered with major names in children's entertainment, co-producing shows with Sesame Workshop, The Jim Henson Company and the BBC.

The company has won over 50 major international television awards-including a BAFTA Award the Prix Jeunesse award, two Emmy nominations, a British Animation Award, RTS awards and many more and in business, they have been ranked among the UK's top indie producers by Televisual and been ranked at the top of the Deloitte UK and Ireland Fast 50 in 2013.

Television shows

Odo 
This series is produced by Sixteen South in co-production with Polish newcomer animation studio Letko. This series focuses on the smallest owl in a forest camp who doesn’t let his size stop him from believing in himself and trying to prove he can do whatever he puts his mind to.

Pinkalicious & Peterrific 
Pinkalicious & Peterrific is an animated TV series based on the Pinkalicious series of books that premiered on February 19, 2018 on PBS Kids.

Lily's Driftwood Bay
Lily's Driftwood Bay is a 52 x 7 minutes, mixed media animated show for 4-6 year olds. Season one premiered in Spring 2014 and airs around the world on: Nick Jr., Sprout (TV network), ABC, SVT, MTV3, RTÉ, HOP!, NRK, TVO and is being sold to other worldwide territories by The Jim Henson Company. Driftwood Bay is a special island that exists in the imagination of Lily, who creates a world of adventure and friendship from treasures she finds washed up on the beach.

Lily's Driftwood Bay received the following awards:

CINE Golden Eagle - 2015
 Best Animated Series - Hugo Television Award, Chicago - 2015
Broadcast Awards for Best Pre-School Programme - 2015

Pajanimals
Pajanimals follows the adventures of four cuddly musical puppets.  Sixteen South partnered with The Jim Henson Company and PBS Kids Sprout to produce a full-length series of 52 x 11 minute episodes. Pajanimals debuted on 10 October 2011 and airs globally on Sprout, NBC Kids, Disney Junior, ABC , TVNZ , Nick Jr., TG4 and Tiny Pop.

Pajanimals received the following nominations/awards:

Emmy nomination for Outstanding Pre-School Children's Series – 2013
Emmy nomination for Outstanding Directing in a Children's Series - 2013
Parent's Choice Recommended Seal – 2012

Big & Small 
Big & Small is a children’s preschool show following the lives of two very different best friends named Big and Small. Sixteen South partnered with London-based Kindle Entertainment to give the show a new production home in Belfast and produce a third season which aired on CBeebies in 2011.

Big & Small received the following awards:

KidScreen award for Best Writing in a Children's Programme - 2013
BAFTA for Best Interactive Service - 2009
RTS Television Award for Best Children's Programme - 2009

Big City Park 
Big City Park is a 26 x 14 minute preschool show, co-produced with BBC Scotland, that’s all about getting outside and having fun – whatever the weather. It was shot in Ormeau Park, Belfast and features Billy the badger, Dara the fox and their ageless friend, Ruairi who all live in the park - along with their human friend, May the park keeper who hosted the series. It was a BBC featured show for August 2010 and rated very highly with over 24% of the audience. It peaked with an audience share of 341,000 on 20 August with an average of 244,000 across the series. It was the second most watched show in its slot on CBeebies during August 2010 and the first show attracted 19,000 viewers on i Player alone.

Big City Park received the following awards:

BAFTA Scotland for Best Children's Series - 2011
IFTA for Best Youth/Children's programme, Ireland - 2011
 Silver Plaque - Hugo Television Award, Chicago - 2011
CINE Golden Eagle - 2011
 Commended - Celtic Media Festival – 2011

Sesame Tree
Sesame Tree, a version of Sesame Street made in Northern Ireland, is a children's television series produced by Sixteen South and Sesame Workshop. The first episode aired on BBC 2 in Northern Ireland on 5 April 2008 with the first series subsequently airing nationwide on BBC in August 2008.  A second series was launched in November 2010 and broadcast on BBC from 22 November 2010.

Sesame Tree received the following nominations/awards:

 Gold Plaque - Hugo Television Award, Chicago - 2011
CINE Golden Eagle - 2011
 Winner - Hugo Television Award, Chicago - 2010
CINE Golden Eagle – 2010

Upcoming television shows

Ivory Towers 
Ivory Towers is a 2D-animated series about a four-year-old elephant who regularly visits her grandfather at a home for elderly animals.

Spaghetti Sisters 
Spaghetti Sisters is a 2D-animated series that tells the story of two sisters in a remote mountain range and their plans to keep the family’s failing pasta restaurant afloat.

Sharks In Shirts 
Sharks In Shirts is a 2D-animated series about three teenage sharks whose mischief catches up with them when a chemistry experiment goes wrong and lands them on a school’s football team for the year.

Super Snail 
Super Snail is a 2D series about a slug named Kevin who, despite being an administrator at a newspaper, is quite slow and often holds things up in a fast-paced news world.

The Coop Troop 
The Coop Troop is a CGI series revolving around a group of barnyard animals on a mission to help other animals with their problems. It is being produced by Sixteen South, Chinese company Tencent, and French studio Technicolor Animation Productions, with an intended release year of 2023.

Awards and nominations 
 2013 – Deloitte Fast 500 EMEA Awards – 68th place
 2013 – Deloitte Fast 50 Awards UK - 7th Place
 2013 – Deloitte Fast 50 Awards Ireland  - 2nd Place
 2013 – Ernst & Young Entrepreneur of the Year Award – Finalist
 2013 - Aisling Awards – Best Business - Finalist
 2013 - Emmy nomination for Outstanding Pre-School Children's Series - Pajanimals
 2013 - Emmy nomination for Outstanding Directing in a Children's Series - Pajanimals
 2013 - Kidscreen Award for Best Writing in a Children's Programme – Big & Small
 2013 – Belfast Telegraph Business Award – Best Small/Medium Business - Finalist
 2013 – Northern Ireland’s Leaders in Business – Colin Williams
 2012 – Belfast Business Awards – Best Creative Business – Finalist
 2012 – Belfast Business Awards – Best Business Innovation – Finalist
 2012 – Belfast Business Awards – Best International Trade - Finalist
 2012 – Rated in Televisual Top 100 Indie Producers
 2012 - Parent's Choice Recommended Seal – Pajanimals
 2012 – Deloitte Rising Star – Technology Fast 50 Awards
 2011 – Rated in Televisual Top 100 Indie Producers
 2011 - BAFTA Scotland for Best Children's Series – Big City Park
 2011 - IFTA for Best Youth/Children's programme, Ireland – Big City Park
 2011 - Hugo Television Award, Chicago - Silver Plaque – Big City Park
 2011 - CINE Golden Eagle – Big City Park
 2011 - Celtic Media Festival – Commended – Big City Park
 2011 - Gold Plaque - Hugo Television Award, Chicago – Sesame Tree
 2011 - CINE Golden Eagle – Sesame Tree
 2011 – Deloitte Rising Star – Technology Fast 50 Awards
 2010 – Rated in Televisual Top 100 Indie Producers
 2010 - Hugo Television Award, Chicago – Winner – Sesame Tree
 2010 - CINE Golden Eagle – Sesame Tree
 2010 – Belfast Business Awards - Best Creative Industry - Winner

References

External links
 http://www.sixteensouth.tv/ Sixteen South website

Companies based in Belfast
Mass media companies of Northern Ireland